Julio Gervasio Pérez Gutiérrez (19 June 1926 – 22 September 2002) was an Uruguayan footballer.

Biography
From 1950 to 1957 he played for Club Nacional de Football, winning the Uruguayan championship in 1950, 52, 55 and 56. He also earned 22 caps and scored 9 goals for the Uruguay national football team from 1947 to 1956. He was part of Uruguay's championship team at the 1950 FIFA World Cup, and also participated in the 1954 FIFA World Cup. During the 1950 World Cup Final, he famously wet himself during the national anthem.

In Brazil he played for Sport Club Internacional.

Pérez died in 2002. His remains are buried at Cementerio del Buceo, Montevideo.

References

External links

Profile (in Spanish)
Career (in Spanish)
Interview (in Spanish)

1926 births
2002 deaths
Footballers from Montevideo
Uruguayan footballers
Uruguay international footballers
1950 FIFA World Cup players
1954 FIFA World Cup players
FIFA World Cup-winning players
Club Nacional de Football players
Sport Club Internacional players
Expatriate footballers in Brazil
Burials at Cementerio del Buceo, Montevideo
Club Atlético River Plate (Montevideo) players

Association football forwards